Lyonsville is an unincorporated community in Tehama County, in the U.S. state of California.

History
A post office was established at Lyonsville in 1883, and remained in operation until 1937. The community was named after Darwyn Lyon, a railroad official.

References

Unincorporated communities in Tehama County, California